Whit Taylor is an American cartoonist.

Taylor grew up in New Jersey and is based in New York, where she works as a Public Health Professional.  She pursued film before turning to comics after attending a number of comics conventions and shows.  She has contributed to The Comics Beat, The Comics Journal, and other comics news outlets.  In 2014 she was a juror for the Ignatz Awards.

Recognition

Works

 Watermelon (2011, self-published)
 Relics (2012, self-published)
 Madtown High (2013, self-published five-issue series)
 Stethoscope Microphone (2013, self-published)
 Boxes (2013, self-published)
 The Anthropologists (2014, Sparkplug Books)
 Berries (2014, self-published)
 Up Down Clown (2015, Ninth Art Press)
 Ghost (2015, self-published)

References

Works cited

External links
 

African-American comics creators
American cartoonists
American women cartoonists
Artists from New Jersey
Artists from New York (state)
Living people
Year of birth missing (living people)
21st-century African-American people
21st-century African-American women